The 1943 German Ice Hockey Championship was the 27th season of the German Ice Hockey Championship, the national championship of Germany. The championship was abandoned after the first semifinal.

First round

Quarterfinals

Semifinals

References

External links
German ice hockey standings 1933-1945
Ger
German Ice Hockey Championship seasons
Champion